The 2014 Championship League was a professional non-ranking snooker tournament that was played from 6 January to 6 March 2014 at the Crondon Park Golf Club in Stock, England.

Shaun Murphy made the 103rd official maximum break during his league stage match against Mark Davis in group two. This was Murphy's second official 147 break and the sixth in the 2013/2014 season. It was also the first maximum break in the history of the tournament. During the same day Neil Robertson defeated Joe Perry 3–0. During the match he made three century breaks, which took the number of his century breaks in the season to 63, breaking the record of most centuries compiled in a single season previously held by Judd Trump, who compiled 61 in the previous season. In all Robertson made 22 century breaks in this year's Championship League; a substantial contribution to his record-breaking 103 century break season.

Judd Trump won his second Championship League title by defeating defending champion Martin Gould 3–1 in the final, and earned a place at the 2014 Champion of Champions.

Prize fund
The breakdown of prize money for this year is shown below:

Group 1–7
Winner: £3,000
Runner-up: £2,000
Semi-final: £1,000
Frame-win (league stage): £100
Frame-win (play-offs): £300
Highest break: £500
Winners' group
Winner: £10,000
Runner-up: £5,000
Semi-final: £3,000
Frame-win (league stage): £200
Frame-win (play-offs): £300
Highest break: £1,000

Tournament total: £179,500

Group one
Group one was played on 6 and 7 January 2014. Ricky Walden was the first player to qualify for the winners group.

Matches

Judd Trump 3–1 Shaun Murphy
Stuart Bingham 2–3 Ricky Walden
Mark Davis 3–1 Robert Milkins
Ali Carter 3–0 Judd Trump
Shaun Murphy 3–2 Stuart Bingham
Ricky Walden 3–1 Mark Davis
Robert Milkins 0–3 Ali Carter
Judd Trump 3–1 Stuart Bingham
Shaun Murphy 3–2 Ricky Walden
Mark Davis 3–1 Ali Carter
Stuart Bingham 2–3 Ali Carter
Robert Milkins 0–3 Ricky Walden
Judd Trump 3–0 Robert Milkins
Shaun Murphy 0–3 Mark Davis
Ricky Walden 2–3 Ali Carter
Stuart Bingham 3–1 Robert Milkins
Shaun Murphy 1–3 Ali Carter
Judd Trump 3–0 Mark Davis
Stuart Bingham 1–3 Mark Davis
Shaun Murphy 2–3 Robert Milkins
Judd Trump 3–0 Ricky Walden

Table

Play-offs

Group two
Group two was played on 8 and 9 January 2014. Joe Perry was the second player to qualify for the winners group.

Matches

Judd Trump 3–0 Ali Carter
Mark Davis 2–3 Shaun Murphy
Neil Robertson 3–1 Barry Hawkins
Joe Perry 3–1 Judd Trump
Ali Carter 3–1 Mark Davis
Shaun Murphy 2–3 Neil Robertson
Barry Hawkins 1–3 Joe Perry
Judd Trump 3–1 Mark Davis
Ali Carter 0–3 Shaun Murphy
Neil Robertson 3–0 Joe Perry
Mark Davis 2–3 Joe Perry
Barry Hawkins 0–3 Shaun Murphy
Judd Trump 3–1 Barry Hawkins
Ali Carter 1–3 Neil Robertson
Shaun Murphy 1–3 Joe Perry
Mark Davis 3–0 Barry Hawkins
Ali Carter 1–3 Joe Perry
Judd Trump 3–1 Neil Robertson
Mark Davis 3–0 Neil Robertson
Ali Carter 3–1 Barry Hawkins
Judd Trump 3–1 Shaun Murphy

Table

Play-offs

Group three
Group three was played on 20 and 21 January 2014. Judd Trump was the third player to qualify for the winners group.

Matches

Judd Trump 0–3 Neil Robertson
Shaun Murphy 3–0 Mark Davis
Graeme Dott 3–0 Matthew Stevens
Ryan Day 1–3 Judd Trump
Neil Robertson 3–2 Shaun Murphy
Mark Davis 3–2 Graeme Dott
Matthew Stevens 3–1 Ryan Day
Judd Trump 1–3 Shaun Murphy
Neil Robertson 3–1 Mark Davis
Graeme Dott 2–3 Ryan Day
Shaun Murphy 3–1 Ryan Day
Matthew Stevens 3–2 Mark Davis
Judd Trump 3–1 Matthew Stevens
Neil Robertson 3–2 Graeme Dott
Mark Davis 2–3 Ryan Day
Shaun Murphy 3–1 Matthew Stevens
Neil Robertson 2–3 Ryan Day
Judd Trump 3–0 Graeme Dott
Shaun Murphy 3–2 Graeme Dott
Neil Robertson 2–3 Matthew Stevens
Judd Trump 1–3 Mark Davis

Table

Play-offs

Group four
Group four was played on 22 and 23 January 2014. Stephen Maguire was the fourth player to qualify for the winners group.

Matches

Ryan Day 1–3 Shaun Murphy
Neil Robertson 3–1 Matthew Stevens
Mark Selby 1–3 Stephen Maguire
Tom Ford 1–3 Ryan Day
Shaun Murphy 2–3 Neil Robertson
Matthew Stevens 3–2 Mark Selby
Stephen Maguire 3–1 Tom Ford
Ryan Day 1–3 Neil Robertson
Shaun Murphy 3–1 Matthew Stevens
Mark Selby 3–0 Tom Ford
Neil Robertson 2–3 Tom Ford
Stephen Maguire 3–2 Matthew Stevens
Ryan Day 2–3 Stephen Maguire
Shaun Murphy 3–2 Mark Selby
Matthew Stevens 3–2 Tom Ford
Neil Robertson 2–3 Stephen Maguire
Shaun Murphy 1–3 Tom Ford
Ryan Day 3–0 Mark Selby
Neil Robertson 1–3 Mark Selby
Shaun Murphy 2–3 Stephen Maguire
Ryan Day 3–1 Matthew Stevens

Table

Play-offs

Group five
Group five was played on 10 and 11 February 2014. Shaun Murphy was the fifth player to qualify for the winners group.

Matches

Neil Robertson 0–3 Shaun Murphy
 Ryan Day 3–0 Mark Selby
John Higgins 1–3 Dominic Dale
Marco Fu 3–2 Neil Robertson
Shaun Murphy 3–1 Ryan Day
Mark Selby 0–3 John Higgins
Dominic Dale 1–3 Marco Fu
Neil Robertson 3–1 Ryan Day
Shaun Murphy 3–1 Mark Selby
John Higgins 3–2 Marco Fu
Ryan Day 3–2 Marco Fu
Dominic Dale 0–3 Mark Selby
Neil Robertson 2–3 Dominic Dale
Shaun Murphy 3–0 John Higgins
Mark Selby 3–2 Marco Fu
Ryan Day 1–3 Dominic Dale
Shaun Murphy 1–3 Marco Fu
Neil Robertson 2–3 John Higgins
Ryan Day 3–0 John Higgins
Shaun Murphy 1–3 Dominic Dale
Neil Robertson 2–3 Mark Selby

Table

Play-offs

Group six
Group six was played on 12 and 13 February 2014. Martin Gould was the sixth player to qualify for the winners group.

Matches

Dominic Dale 1–3 Marco Fu
Ryan Day 0–3 John Higgins
Martin Gould 1–3 Mark Williams
Michael Holt 3–1 Dominic Dale
Marco Fu 2–3 Ryan Day
John Higgins 1–3 Martin Gould
Mark Williams 3–1 Michael Holt
Dominic Dale 0–3 Ryan Day
Marco Fu 2–3 John Higgins
Martin Gould 3–0 Michael Holt
Ryan Day 3–0 Michael Holt
Mark Williams 0–3 John Higgins
Dominic Dale 1–3 Mark Williams
Marco Fu 2–3 Martin Gould
John Higgins 3–2 Michael Holt
Ryan Day 0–3 Mark Williams
Marco Fu 1–3 Michael Holt
Dominic Dale 1–3 Martin Gould
Ryan Day 1–3 Martin Gould
Marco Fu 1–3 Mark Williams
Dominic Dale 1–3 John Higgins

Table

Play-offs

Group seven
Group seven was played on 3 and 4 March 2014. Ryan Day was the last player to qualify for the winners group.

Matches

John Higgins 3–0 Mark Williams
Ryan Day 3–0 Marcus Campbell
Peter Ebdon 3–2 Andrew Higginson
Mark King 0–3 John Higgins
Mark Williams 2–3 Ryan Day
Marcus Campbell 3–2 Peter Ebdon
Andrew Higginson 2–3 Mark King
John Higgins 3–0 Ryan Day
Mark Williams 0–3 Marcus Campbell
Peter Ebdon 0–3 Mark King
Ryan Day 3–0 Mark King
Andrew Higginson 3–1 Marcus Campbell
John Higgins 3–0 Andrew Higginson
Mark Williams 0–3 Peter Ebdon
Marcus Campbell 0–3 Mark King
Ryan Day 3–2 Andrew Higginson
Mark Williams 3–2 Mark King
John Higgins 3–1 Peter Ebdon
Ryan Day 3–1 Peter Ebdon
Mark Williams 1–3 Andrew Higginson
John Higgins 3–1 Marcus Campbell

Table

Play-offs

Winners' group
The winners' group was played on 5 and 6 March 2014. Judd Trump won his second Championship League title.

Matches

Ricky Walden 3–1 Joe Perry
Judd Trump 2–3 Stephen Maguire
Shaun Murphy 2–3 Martin Gould
Ryan Day 0–3 Ricky Walden
Joe Perry 2–3 Judd Trump
Stephen Maguire 1–3 Shaun Murphy
Martin Gould 2–3 Ryan Day
Ricky Walden 1–3 Judd Trump
Joe Perry 1–3 Stephen Maguire
Shaun Murphy 3–0 Ryan Day
Judd Trump 0–3 Ryan Day
Martin Gould 2–3 Stephen Maguire
Ricky Walden 1–3 Martin Gould
Joe Perry 1–3 Shaun Murphy
Stephen Maguire 3–2 Ryan Day
Judd Trump 3–2 Martin Gould
Joe Perry 3–1 Ryan Day
Ricky Walden 1–3 Shaun Murphy
Judd Trump 2–3 Shaun Murphy
Joe Perry 1–3 Martin Gould
Ricky Walden 3–2 Stephen Maguire

Table

Play-offs

Century breaks 
Total: 93

 147 (2), 131, 134, 128, 121, 112, 109, 107, 103, 103, 102, 101  Shaun Murphy
 144, 141 (4), 137, 137, 135, 134, 133, 131, 129, 128, 127, 124, 119, 118, 117, 109, 107, 104, 103, 102, 102, 101  Neil Robertson
 142 (1), 142 (3), 130, 119, 117, 113, 109, 108, 102, 100  Judd Trump
 139 (7), 137  John Higgins
 139 (7), 122, 104, 101  Andrew Higginson
 137 (5), 129, 122, 108, 105, 103, 100  Marco Fu
 135 (W), 132, 128  Stephen Maguire
 134, 131, 124, 102, 101  Mark Davis
 133, 102  Ali Carter
 131  Tom Ford
 130, 126, 119, 105, 106, 102  Mark Selby
 130, 108  Peter Ebdon
 128 (6), 120, 110  Martin Gould
 124  Barry Hawkins
 123, 118, 115, 107, 105, 101  Ryan Day
 121, 106, 106, 105  Michael Holt
 117  Ricky Walden
 103  Joe Perry
 101   Stuart Bingham

Bold: highest break in the indicated group.

Winnings 

Green: Won the group. Bold: Highest break in the group. All prize money in GBP.

References

External links 
 

2014
Championship League
Championship League